Nokia 100 is a basic 2G feature phone released by Nokia on 25 August 2011. The mobile phone is aimed at emerging markets and budget-conscious consumers, and can be bought carrier-unlocked for a relatively low price (€20 or U.S. $30 at launch).

It should not be confused with the original Nokia 100 from 1993, which was a consumer version of the 1992 Nokia 101.

The phone has a color display, an integrated flashlight, an FM radio, and automatic voice alarm. It was released in blue, pink, black, and red colours.

The device runs on the Series 30 software platform, supports up to five separate address books, and is able to store personalisation data for up to five separate SIM cards. The phone also comes with the Solitaire game.

In emerging markets, the phone came with Nokia Life Tools, and with Nokia Money in India.

Nokia 100 is available in a number of languages depending on which territory it is marketed for. Models sold in South Asia support at least twelve languages: English, Hindi, Gujarati, Marathi, Tamil, Bengali, Telugu, Punjabi, Kannada, Malayalam, Assamese and Odia. Models sold in the United Kingdom support four languages: English, French, German and Italian.

References

External links 
 Nokia 100 user guide via B2X

100